Prudential Assurance Co Ltd v London Residuary Body [1991] UKHL 10 is an English land law case, confirming and explaining the requirements of certainty of duration of any lease.

Facts
Mr Nathan owned 263-265 Walworth Rd, Southwark, London before 1930, and the London County Council the road. It planned to widen it, encroaching on a strip of land separating his shop from the road. The LCC bought the freehold of the strip, but agreed he could use it until the project went ahead, and he would pay £30 a year in rent ‘until the strip of land is needed for road-widening’. But by 1988 the road had not been widened and the London Residuary Body (LRB), successor of the LCC held it. Prudential Assurance Ltd now held numbers 263-265.

LRB pleaded that it could end Prudential's right to use its strip (whereby Prudential paid £30 a year); arguing either the lease it granted in 1930 was invalid or that if the court were to uphold some novel form of limitless tenancy it should be deemed capable of ending (termination) on a year's notice either way.

Prudential plead it had a valid limitless tenancy/lease and strictly (outside of say compulsory purchase for wider development) the LRB could only get possession if needed to widen the road. Prudential pointed to the estimated loss/gain of trade from its units £10,000 a year if customers could not cross it. This was the amount of money which LRB might be able to charge it so as to continue to operate its adjoining shop, having a ransom strip if the lease was found to be completely void. Prudential stressed if Nathan had known he would need to pay a market rate access charge to continue to enjoy the pavement/front yard he would never had sold it to the local authority. Prudential begged the court to amend the common law rules rather than rely on the possibility the Law Commission may one day amend it to deal with this unsatisfactory outcome (the voidness of leases not expiring by the effluxion of time).

Millett J found in favour of Prudential. LRB used the leapfrog procedure to go directly to the House of Lords, as it wished to challenge the Court of Appeal cases, In re Midland Railway Co’s Agreement and Ashburn Anstalt v Arnold.

Judgment
The Court, unanimously, led by Lord Templeman held the tenancy was too uncertain to be effective, and thus had not created a binding lease.

Lord Browne-Wilkinson agreed but noted that any successor in title for Mr Nathan would no longer automatically have land that faced the road, which is of commercial importance on such a main road. Nothing could be more unsatisfactory. The Law Commission should look to amend the law. Lord Mustill agreed with Lord Browne-Wilkinson completely.

Cases applied
Lace v Chantler [1944] KB 368, EWCA

Applied in
Mexfield Housing Co-operative Ltd v Berrisford [2011] UKSC 52

See also

English land law
English property law

References and Notes

English land case law
Prudential plc
House of Lords cases
1992 in case law
1992 in British law